Rod Rosenbladt (born 1942) is a former Professor of Theology at Concordia University Irvine in California, and is also well-known among Lutheran, Reformed, and Evangelical Christians as the former co-host of the nationally syndicated radio program "The White Horse Inn". He now does his own program as part of the 1517 project discussed below.

Education 

Rosenbladt was born in the western part of Washington state and studied psychology in his undergraduate degree at Pacific Lutheran University, Tacoma, Washington, and graduated with the B.A. in 1964. He then studied theology at Evangelical Lutheran Theological Seminary in Columbus, Ohio, and graduated with a B.D. in 1968. He pursued post-graduate studies in the philosophy of religion at Trinity Evangelical Divinity School in Deerfield, Illinois, and graduated with an M.A. in 1972. There he was taught by John Warwick Montgomery, and since that time they have been lifelong friends. On Montgomery's advice and recommendation, Rosenbladt then proceeded to doctoral studies in theology at the University of Strasbourg, France, and graduated in 1978 with a Ph.D.

Career 
Rosenbladt is a Lutheran minister in the Lutheran Church–Missouri Synod and assumed pastoral positions in parishes in Huntington Beach, San Gabriel, and La Jolla, California. He has lived in California since 1969 and has held teaching posts at the Graduate Theological Union in Berkeley, California (1973–1977) and at Westmont College in Santa Barbara, California (1973–1977). He was an adjunct member of faculty at Concordia University Irvine from 1979 to 1984, until receiving a permanent lecturer's position in which he has taught theology from 1984 to the present.

During the 1980s, he also served as an evening lecturer in the Master of Arts program in Christian apologetics at the Simon Greenleaf School of Law. The school was founded by John Warwick Montgomery. Rosenbladt taught philosophy of religion and systematic theology to the MA students, and supervised various students' dissertations. He left the school at the same time that Montgomery resigned from his position there.

Rosenbladt has on various occasions participated in formal public debates on theological and apologetic topics. He is also a frequent contributor to Modern Reformation magazine and a regular participant on the White Horse Inn radio program.

On the occasion of his sixty-fifth birthday, he was honored with a festschrift, Theologia et Apologia: Essays in Reformation Theology and its Defense Presented to Rod Rosenbladt.

In 2014 he helped launch 1517 The Legacy Project, a non-profit initiative built, in part, upon his own work, the work of John Warwick Montgomery, and that of Martin Luther.

Bibliography 

 "The Gospel For Those Broken By The Church,"  Live presentation for South Orange County Outreach (2004).
 Christ Alone (Wheaton, IL: Crossway Books, 1999).
 "Reclaiming the Doctrine of Justification," Modern Reformation, Vol. 1 No. 6 (Nov/Dec 1992). 
 "Are You Prepared to Give a Defense? A Crash-Course on Christian Apologetics," Modern Reformation, Vol. 2 No. 3 (May/June 1993). 
 "Christ Died for the Sins of Christians Too," Modern Reformation, Vol. 12 No. 3 (May/June 2003). 
 "Deprivation Within the Evangelical Family and Church," Wittenburg Door, number 13 (June/July 1973).
 "The Integrity of the Gospel Writers," in Christianity for the Tough-Minded, edited by John Warwick Montgomery (Minneapolis: Bethany Fellowship, 1973), pp. 237–243. 
 "Who Do TV Preachers Say That I Am?" in The Agony of Deceit, edited by Michael Horton (Chicago: Moody Press, 1990), pp. 107–120. .
 "What is Apologetics and How Is It Done?" Issues Etc. Journal, Volume 1, number 6 (April 1996)

References

Westmont College alumni
Christian apologists
American Lutheran theologians
1942 births
Living people
People from Tacoma, Washington
Pacific Lutheran University alumni
Trinity Evangelical Divinity School alumni
University of Strasbourg alumni
Concordia University Irvine
Trinity International University faculty
Lutheran Church–Missouri Synod people